Alí Manuel Manouchehri Moghadam Kashan Lobos (born 2 August 1986), known as Alí Manouchehri, is a Chilean retired footballer who played as a centre back and a full back.

Early life
Manouchehri was born in Austria to an Iranian father (died four months before he was born) and a Chilean mother called María Lobos Inzunza. He moved to Coquimbo when he was 6.

Club career

As a child, Manouchehri was with Los Piratas academy. Then he joined Coquimbo Unido youth system and made his professional debut in 2003, at 17. In 2015, he was Chilean Primera División runner-up.

Ali was the figure in the historic campaign of Coquimbo Unido. He score the winning goal against Everton in the minute 97.

In 2007, he played for Levante UD-B of Spain.

In 2008, he played in Deportes Antofagasta and O'Higgins, First Division.

In 2009, he played in Coquimbo Unido.

In 2010, he played in Santiago Morning, First Division.

In 2011, he played in Ñublense, first division.

In 2012, he played in Deportes Concepción, where he was baptized by the people as "the Lion Manouchehri".

In 2013–2014 he played in Coquimbo Unido, where he was champion of the Clausura championship of the First B.

In 2015–2016, he played in Union San Felipe.

He has been nominated to the Chile national team.

In the Chile sub 23 national team

In the Chile national team.

He was recognized as the best defender at the international championship "FIF Pro" developed in Mexico.

Ali Manouchehri has also studied the career of professional coach, that has enhanced his work as a central defender.

In 2016, he played in Boyacá Chicó FC, Colombia, First Division.

International career
Through birth and descent, Manouchehri was eligible to play for Austria, Iran and Chile. He has represented the latter, where he has spent most of his life, at under-23 level.

Personal life
His relatives are mainly inclined towards politics and they emigrated from Chile before he was born due to the military dictatorship of Chile. 

His older brother, is a politician who is a member of the Chamber of Deputies of Chile since 2022.

He and his brother were mainly brought up by his maternal aunt, Marta Lobos, and her husband, Francisco Encina, both politicians. From his aunt, he is cousin of Viviana Encina, a journalist and TV presenter.

References

External links
Web oficial 
Iranians to watch abroad: Ali Manouchehri – VIDEO 
Interview with Alí Manouchehri
Alí Manouchehri, a half-Iranian player shining in Chile
 Ali Manouchehri at PlaymakerStats

1986 births
Living people
Footballers from Vienna
Austrian footballers
Austrian people of Iranian descent
Austrian people of Chilean descent
Sportspeople of Chilean descent
Sportspeople of Iranian descent
Citizens of Chile through descent
Chilean footballers
Chilean people of Iranian descent
Association football central defenders
Association football fullbacks
Coquimbo Unido footballers
Atlético Levante UD players
C.D. Antofagasta footballers
O'Higgins F.C. footballers
Santiago Morning footballers
Ñublense footballers
Deportes Concepción (Chile) footballers
Unión San Felipe footballers
Boyacá Chicó F.C. footballers
Caudal Deportivo footballers
Municipal La Pintana footballers
Chilean Primera División players
Segunda División B players
Primera B de Chile players
Categoría Primera A players
Segunda División Profesional de Chile players
Olympic footballers of Chile
Chile youth international footballers
Chilean expatriate footballers
Chilean expatriate sportspeople in Spain
Expatriate footballers in Spain
Chilean expatriate sportspeople in Colombia
Expatriate footballers in Colombia
Naturalized citizens of Chile
Chilean politicians
Chilean sportsperson-politicians
21st-century Chilean politicians